Oleksiy Miacheslavovych Danilov (born 7 September 1962) is a Ukrainian politician who has been the secretary of the National Security and Defense Council of Ukraine since 3 October 2019.

Early life and early career 
Danilov graduated in 1981 from the Starobilsk State Farm Technical School with a degree in veterinary medicine. In 1981 he began working as a veterinary in a farm in Voroshilovgrad (currently Luhansk). From 1983 to 1987, he worked as a veterinarian in Voroshilovgrad's park "1 May". From 1987 to 1991 he worked as a private veterinarian. From 1991 to 1994 he was engaged in private entrepreneurship.

Political career
Danilov was Mayor of Luhansk from 1994 to 1997. Aged 31 years, he was the youngest ever mayor of Luhansk.

In the 1998 Ukrainian parliamentary election Danilov unsuccessfully ran for a parliamentary seat in electoral district 103 as an independent candidate.

In 1999, Danilov graduated from the University of Luhansk as a licensed history teacher. In 2000, he received a master's degree in management from the East Ukrainian Volodymyr Dahl National University. In 2000, he also received a law degree from the Luhansk State University of Internal Affairs.

In the early 2000s, Danilov was a member of the Yabluko party (which was renamed Party of Free Democrats during his membership). In the 2002 Ukrainian parliamentary election he ran unsuccessfully for parliament on the party list.

In 2000, Danilov was an adviser to the parliamentary Committee on Industrial Policy and Entrepreneurship. From October 2001 to February 2005, he founded the Luhansk Initiative and was its chairman. At the same time, he was as deputy director of the Institute for European Integration and Development (IEID).

Danilov served as the Governor of Luhansk Oblast in 2005.

Danilov was elected to the Verkhovna Rada in 2006 for the Yulia Tymoshenko Bloc. In the 2007 Ukrainian parliamentary election Danilov ran for re-election to parliament for the Party of Free Democrats, but was again unsuccessful. After leaving parliament he returned to his previous position of deputy director of the IEID.

Danilov rose to national prominence on the strength of appearances "on Ukraine's highly-rated national prime time talk show, where he takes on the country's oligarchs, illegal privatizations, the machinations Russia's fifth column in Ukraine, and "treasonous" votes in past parliaments."

Danilov was Deputy Secretary of the National Security and Defense Council from 23 July to 3 October 2019. Since 3 October 2019 he is the Secretary (deputy Chairman, President Volodymyr Zelensky is the formal chairman) of this board.

On 24 January 2022, Danilov said that the movement of Russian troops near Ukraine's border was "not news" and "we don't see any grounds for statements about a full-scale offensive on our country". During the Russian invasion of Ukraine, Danilov urged men elegible for mobilisation to not "hide behind a woman's skirt".

After the 2022 Crimean Bridge explosion Danilov posted a video of the burning bridge alongside a black-and-white clip of Marilyn Monroe singing "Happy Birthday, Mr. President" – a reference to Putin turning 70 the same day.

Political views
In October 2021, Danilov said that he believed that it would be better for Ukraine to be a presidential republic than a parliamentary-presidential one. Danilov argued that it would only be "possible to make a leap forward" with a "responsible person who understands what they are going for."

Family
Danilov is married to Lyudmyla Volodymyrovna Danilova (Peregudova). The couple have four children and seven grandchildren. Despite having claimed to have evacuated his mother from separatist territory, it was revealed that she continues to live in the Russian-occupied city of Luhansk. He has an older brother and nephew.

See also 
 List of members of the parliament of Ukraine, 2006–07
 List of mayors of Luhansk

References

External links 
 
 

1962 births
Living people
20th-century Ukrainian politicians
21st-century Ukrainian politicians
Ukrainian veterinarians
People from Krasnyi Luch
Mayors of places in Ukraine
Governors of Luhansk Oblast
East Ukrainian Volodymyr Dahl National University alumni
University of Luhansk alumni
Fifth convocation members of the Verkhovna Rada
Secretaries of National Security and Defense Council of Ukraine
Social Democratic Party of Ukraine (united) politicians
Independent politicians of Yulia Tymoshenko Bloc
Party of Free Democrats politicians